Efrén Llarena is a Spanish rally driver born 26 May 1995 in Espinosa de los Monteros, Burgos, Castilla y León. In 2021 he finished runner up in the European Rally Championship behind Andreas Mikkelsen whilst driving his long term co-driver Sara Fernández to the co-driver's championship title. The following year in 2022, Llarena won the European Rally Championship, securing the title with two rounds remaining in the championship.

Career
Llarena made his rally debut in 2013 just weeks after his 18th birthday at the Rallysprint de San Miguel in a Renault Clio Sport. He continued to enter rallies in Spain in 2013, 2014 and 2015 and with co-driver Igor Zatika had some success in their class. He finished 3rd in the Spanish Championship junior category in 2014. In 2016 he began working with Sara Fernández and alternated between a Suzuki Swift Sport and a Peugeot 208 R2. He won the Suzuki Swift Cup that year, run on Spanish Championship rallies, whilst also gaining more experience on French rallies. In 2017 the crew ran only in the Peugeot, winning the Spanish Gravel Junior Championship and the Volant Peugeot Cup in France.

In 2018, the crew entered the European Rally Championship (ERC) for the first time with Rally Team Spain. Llarena finished third in ERC3 and ERC3 Junior Championships. That year he also debuted in four-wheel-drive in a Ford Fiesta R5 at Rally Comunidad de Madrid RACE, finishing fourth out of 88 starters. Entering ERC3 for two-wheel drive again in 2019 brought championship success. Three class wins at Azores Rally, Barum Czech Rally Zlín and Cyprus Rally helped to deliver the ERC3 and ERC3 Junior titles, this also helped propel Llarena to a R5 campaign in ERC in 2020. In this season he finished 6th overall and 3rd in the Junior category in a Citroën C3 Rally2, his best result coming at Rally Hungary where a third position put him on the podium.

In 2021, switching to a Škoda Fabia Rally2 evo, Llarena improved again by finishing second in the ERC behind ex-Volkswagen, Citroën and Hyundai works driver Andreas Mikkelsen. Remarkably, Llarena gained his first and only overall victory in 2021 although it was a non-championship event in Spain, the Rally de Tierra de Murchante.

In 2022, Llarena scored his first ERC win at the Azores Rallye, when he overtook local driver Ricardo Moura on the final stage. Llarena went on to win the series championship, securing his championship title at the start of the Barum Czech Rally Zlín.

References

External links
Profile at eWRC-Results.com
Biography at FIAERC.com

Spanish rally drivers
1995 births
Living people
Peugeot Sport drivers
European Rally Championship drivers
Saintéloc Racing drivers